Giuseppe Maddaloni (born 10 July 1976) is an Italian judoka. He was born in Naples.

He won a gold medal in the lightweight (66–73 kg) division at the 2000 Summer Olympics.

He was trained by his father Gianni Maddaloni, in the district of Scampia, the Neapolitan region of Italy.

In Popular Culture

In 2014 a movie was made about his life and that of his father, called :it:L'oro di Scampia (the gold of Scampia), in 2022 it was streaming on Netflix.

In 2018 the International Judo Federation made a movie about his father and the work he continues to do called Judo for the World - Italy.

Achievements

References

External links

 
 
 

1976 births
Living people
Italian male judoka
Judoka at the 2000 Summer Olympics
Judoka at the 2008 Summer Olympics
Olympic judoka of Italy
Olympic gold medalists for Italy
Sportspeople from Naples
Olympic medalists in judo
Medalists at the 2000 Summer Olympics
Mediterranean Games gold medalists for Italy
Mediterranean Games bronze medalists for Italy
Mediterranean Games medalists in judo
Competitors at the 1997 Mediterranean Games
Competitors at the 2005 Mediterranean Games
Judoka of Fiamme Oro
20th-century Italian people
21st-century Italian people